Mark McCracken (born August 1, 1960) is an American actor.

McCracken was born in Greensboro, North Carolina and attended the University of North Carolina at Greensboro. He appeared in the films We Were Soldiers with Mel Gibson, Joe Dante's horror/comedy Matinee,  and also portrayed Pumpkinhead in Pumpkinhead II: Blood Wings. His television credits include Ellen, Miami Vice, and The Outer Limits.

Filmography
 Death of a Saleswoman (2005) as Abel Gunk
 The Court (TV) as Technical Director (2 episodes)
 We Were Soldiers (2002) as Ed "Too Tall" Freeman
 The Comedy Team of Pete & James (2001) as Replacement Pete
 DNA (1997) as Sergeant Reinhardt / Balacau
 aka Genetic Code (Europe: English title)
 The Outer Limits as Jailer (1 episode, 1995)
 Ellen as Richard (1 episode, 1994)
 Pumpkinhead II: Blood Wings (1994) as Pumpkinhead
 Matinee (1993) as Mant / Bill
 Swamp Thing as Matt Caleb (1 episode, 1992)
 Disney Presents The 100 Lives of Black Jack Savage as Freddie (1 episode, 1991)
 B.L. Stryker (1 episode, 1989)
 Miami Vice  ... (3 episodes, 1987–1989)

References

External links
 

1960 births
Living people